Nicolas Hotman (also Autheman, Haultemant, Hautman, Otteman; ca. 1610–1663) was a Baroque composer, who spent most of his career in France. He is believed to have been from Germany, but was probably born in Brussels.  He came with his family to Paris around 1626, where he died in April of the year 1663.

He was known to be an expert player of the lute, theorbo, and the viola da gamba, as well as the composer of a few surviving musical compositions. Hotman is sometimes referred to as the teacher of violist Monsieur de Sainte-Colombe.

Works
Suite de Monsieur Otteman
Airs à boire à 3 parties (Paris, 1664)

References

External links 
 Brief information on Hotman
 Short reference to relationship between Sainte-Colombe and Hotman 

French male classical composers
German classical composers
German male classical composers
Belgian male classical composers
French Baroque composers
French lutenists
French Baroque viol players
1610s births
1663 deaths
17th-century classical composers
17th-century male musicians